The Tower of Varona (Spanish: Torre de los Varona) is a tower located in Villanañe, Valdegovia, Spain. It was declared Bien de Interés Cultural in 1984.

The origin of this tower dates back to the end of the 14th or start of the 15th century. The surname Varona dates back to the 7th century and came into being with Doña María Ruiz Pérez. From then until the present day, the tower has been inhabited by her direct descendants.

The whole building has been restored by the Provincial Council of Álava. Its interior has several areas that still retain their traditional character and it is possible to see good examples of furniture throughout the various living rooms, which belongs to the owners of the Tower-Mansion. The wallpapers and the collection of ceramics are also very interesting.

The tower stands out on one side of the complex. The whole building is defended by a crenellated barbican and walls with arrow slits, as well as a wide moat filled with water.

References

External links 

 Varona tower website

Buildings and structures in Álava
Bien de Interés Cultural landmarks in Álava
Villañañe